Sports Mix is a confectionery product manufactured in the UK under the brand-name of Maynards Bassetts, which is itself part of the Cadbury UK brand now owned by Mondelēz International and was formerly produced by Lion Confectionery. Both Maynards and Lion are owned by Cadbury UK, formerly Cadbury Trebor Bassett.

The Lion brand has since been adopted by Tangerine Confectionery who manufacture Sports Mix to the original Lion Confectionery version.

The product consists of fruit-flavoured hard gums in the shape of sports equipment and as at October 2015, the shapes found in the packs are interpreted as;

The gums come in five different colours; red, orange, black, yellow and green and each has its own flavour. The product used to contain liquorice flavoured pieces, but this has now been replaced by blackcurrant. The larger 2kg box still contains black, liquorice flavoured gums and is available on eBay or sold loose in traditional UK sweet (candy) shops. 

The Maynard's Sports Mix contains the natural colours of anthocyanins, Carbon black, paprika extract, and lutein.

(*) Percentage reference intake of an average adult (8400 kJ / 2000 kcal)

It is not suitable for vegetarians because it contains gelatin.

References

British confectionery
Candy